J. Y. A Kwofie is a former Ghanaian police office and was the Inspector General of Police of the Ghana Police Service from 1 January 1990 to 30 September 1996.

References

Living people
Ghanaian police officers
Ghanaian Inspector Generals of Police
Year of birth missing (living people)